Hartford Beach State Park is a South Dakota state park on Big Stone Lake in Roberts County, South Dakota in the United States.  The park is open for year-round recreation, including cabins, camping, swimming, fishing, hiking, disc golf and boating.

Recreation
Hartford Beach State Park is open for year-round recreation. There are 87 campsites which feature electric hook-ups and 4 cabins. Fishing and a boat ramp to Big Stone Lake are available.

See also
List of South Dakota state parks

References

External links
 Hartford Beach State Park
 Hartford Beach State Park - Reservations

Protected areas of Roberts County, South Dakota
State parks of South Dakota